Hilum may refer to:
 Hilum (anatomy), a part of an organ where structures such as blood vessels and nerves enter the body
 Hilum (botany), a scar on a seed or spore created by detachment

See also
 Fovea (disambiguation), another term associated with pits or depressions in anatomy and botany
 Hila (disambiguation)
 Hilum of kidney
 Hilum of lung
 Hilum of lymph node
 Splenic hilum
 Hailam, the Hokkien name for Hainan